N. Sreedharan Nair (11 September 1922 – 19 October 1986), popularly known as  Kottarakkara Sreedharan Nair or just Kottarakkara, was an Indian actor who appeared Malayalam movies. He hailed from Kottarakkara in Kollam district of Kerala.

Sreedharan Nair won two Kerala state film awards. In 1970, he won the best actor award and in 1969 the second best actor award.

He is best remembered for his role as Chempankunju in the national award winning film Chemmeen directed by Ramu Kariat. Other impressive performances were in the films Veluthampi Dalava (as Veluthampi Dalava), Thommante Makkal (1965) as Thomman, and Pazhassi Raja  (1964) as Pazhassi Raja, Viruthan Shanku (1968) by P. Venu. Kottarakkara is also known for playing the role of devil magician in the 1984 fantasy film My Dear Kuttichathan. Popular Malayalam actor Saikumar is his son.

Personal life
Sreedharan Nair was born in 1922 to Padinjattinkara Korattiyode Narayana Pillai and Ummini Amma in 1922. He had his primary education from Eswara vilasam higher secondary school. He started acting in dramas at the age of 10. He owned drama troupes Jayasree and Kalamandiram.

He was known to be a very outspoken, stubborn man with a short temper. Once, he walked out of the set of Ara Nazhika Neram due to some disputes. He did not allow anyone seeking compromise to open the gate and enter into his house compound to discuss with him. When everyone was afraid to talk to him, someone suggested that actor Sathyan should approach Sreedharan Nair to resolve the issue. After talking with Sathyan, Sreedharan Nair set aside the disputes & agreed to act in the movie.

Sreedharan Nair married  Vijayalakshmi Amma. They had eight children, Jaysree, Geetha, Laila, Shobha, Kala, Sai Kumar, Beena, and Shaila. His son Sai Kumar, daughters Shobha Mohan, Sylaja his son-in-law Mohan Kumar, his grandchildren Anil Pappan, Vinu Mohan Anu Mohan, Vaishnavi saikumar and his great-grandson Kailasveswar S Nair are all film/TV actors.

Awards

 1970 Kerala State Film Award for Best Actor -Ara Nazhika Neram
 1969 Kerala State Film Award for Second Best Actor – Koottukudumbam

Filmography

Kannada flm
 1968 - Bangalore Mail

See also
National Film Awards
Kerala State Film Awards
Chemmeen
Sai Kumar

References

External links

Indian male film actors
Kerala State Film Award winners
Male actors from Kollam
1986 deaths
1922 births
20th-century Indian male actors